A Tiger Walks is a 1964 American drama film directed by Norman Tokar and starring Brian Keith and Vera Miles. Based on the 1960 novel of the same name by Ian Niall, it was produced by Walt Disney Productions. It was Indian actor Sabu's last film, released only a few months after his death.

Plot
Raja, a mistreated Bengal tiger, escapes from a traveling circus, and it hides in the woods surrounding the small town of Scotia. The new arrival starts a panic, and the townsfolk want Raja killed with the exception of Julie Williams (played by Pamela Franklin), the sheriff's daughter. Julie wishes to capture Raja and put it in a zoo. To raise enough money to purchase Raja from the circus, she starts a campaign with the slogan "save the tiger" to rally children across the nation in the tiger's defense, resulting in national attention brought to the sleepy town. However, she, her father, and an Indian tiger trainer first need to find Raja before the National Guard, who are under orders to shoot the tiger on sight.

Cast
Brian Keith as Sheriff Pete Williams
Vera Miles as Dorothy Williams
Pamela Franklin as Julie Williams
Sabu as Ram Singh
Edward Andrews as Governor Robbins
Una Merkel as Mrs. Watkins
Peter Brown as Vern Goodman
Kevin Corcoran as Tom Hadley
Frank McHugh as Bill Watkins
Connie Gilchrist as Liddy Lewis
Arthur Hunnicutt as Frank Lewis
Theodore Marcuse as Josef Pietz
Merry Anders as Betty Collins
Frank Aletter as Joe Riley
Jack Albertson as Sam Grant
Donald May as Captain Anderson
Stafford Repp as Mr. Blonden, City Editor
Serang and Sultan as Raja

See also
List of American films of 1964

References

External links

1964 films
1964 drama films
American drama films
Films about tigers
Walt Disney Pictures films
Films directed by Norman Tokar
Films scored by Buddy Baker (composer)
Films produced by Ron W. Miller
Films produced by Bill Anderson (producer)
Films based on British novels
1960s English-language films
1960s American films